Clinton Street Historic District is a national historic district located in the Washington Square West neighborhood of Philadelphia, Pennsylvania. It includes 71 brick rowhouses built between 1835 and 1850. They are between 3 1/2- and 4-stories and consist of the typical Philadelphia rowhouse plan with front building, piazza, and back building.  It was a fashionable residential section in the 19th century and home to such notable figures as architect Addison Hutton (1834–1916), Rt. Rev. William Bacon Stevens (1815-1887), and Agnes Repplier (1855-1950). Located in the district and separately listed is the J. Peter Lesley House at 1008 Clinton Street.

It was added to the National Register of Historic Places in 1972.

References

Houses on the National Register of Historic Places in Philadelphia
Historic districts in Philadelphia
Houses completed in 1850
Washington Square West, Philadelphia
Historic districts on the National Register of Historic Places in Pennsylvania